The United States Federal Technology Transfer Act of 1986 (P.L. 99-502) was, after the Stevenson-Wydler Technology Innovation Act of 1980, the second major piece of legislation focused on technology transfer from federal government agencies to the commercial sector. The act established the Federal Laboratory Consortium and enabled federal laboratories to enter into Cooperative Research and Development Agreements (CRADAs) and to negotiate licenses for patented inventions made at the laboratory.

Follow up legislation
The 'Small Business Technology Transfer Act of 1992' was enacted to increase opportunities for small businesses and non profit organizations to collaborate with federal research laboratories. Agencies with a more than $1 billion extramural research and development budget must reserve 0.3% of their extramural research budget for Small Business Technology Transfer (STTR) awards.

In parallel, in December 1992, the related 'Small Business Research and Development Enhancement Act' (P.L. 102-564) was passed to reauthorize the Small Business Innovation Research (SBIR) program for joint ventures until September 30, 2000. The 'Small Business Reauthorization Act of 2000' (P.L. 106-554) reauthorized the program until September 30, 2008. Numerous extensions passed with the most recent one extending the SBIR program through 2022. It is to "incentivize and enable startups and small business to undertake R&D with high technical risk and high commercial reward."

See also
 Bayh–Dole Act of 1980 (P.L. 96-517)
 Executive Order 12591 (1987)
 Executive Order 12999: Educational Technology
 Office of Research and Technology Applications
 Stevenson-Wydler Technology Innovation Act of 1980 (P.L. 96-480)

Notes

United States federal commerce legislation
Technology transfer